Marek Pittner (born 14 February 1997) is a Slovak footballer who plays as a defender for FK Pohronie.

Club career

FK Senica
Pittner made his Fortuna Liga debut for Senica on 20 March 2015 in a match against Spartak Myjava.

References

External links
 FK Senica profile
 
 Futbalnet profile

1997 births
Living people
Sportspeople from Žiar nad Hronom
Slovak footballers
Association football defenders
FK Senica players
FK Pohronie players
FC ŠTK 1914 Šamorín players
KFC Komárno players
FC Rohožník players
FC Petržalka players
Slovak Super Liga players
2. Liga (Slovakia) players